Carl Huntington (December 4, 1947 – October 13, 2000) was an Athabaskan-American dog musher who is best known for winning the 1974 Iditarod Trail Sled Dog Race as a rookie, with a time of 20 days, 15 hours, 1 minute, 7 seconds.

In addition to winning the Iditarod, he also won the 1974 Open World Championship Race, or the Fur Rendezvous Race- a unique feat due to the fact that this race was a speed competition, while the Iditarod is a distance competition. In reference to this, musher Libby Riddles said "There's nobody that has quite the record he has."

Huntington died of an apparent suicide on October 13, 2000. He had recently been estranged from his family, and was charged with sexual abuse of a minor.

References

1947 births
2000 suicides
Alaskan Athabaskan people
American dog mushers
Dog mushers from Alaska
Iditarod champions
People from Yukon–Koyukuk Census Area, Alaska
Suicides in Alaska
People charged with sex crimes